Catherine Emingerová (13 July 18569 September 1934) was a Czech composer, pianist, and music educator.  She was also a prolific music writer and journalist, producing numerous books, essays, reviews and articles on music.

Biography

Emingerová was born in Prague, the daughter of Prague lawyer Jan Eminger and his wife Julie Emingerová. Kateřina's sister Helena (1858–1943) became well known as a painter and graphic artist. Kateřina completed early studies under František Škroup, Bedřich Smetana, Adolf Čech, František Zdeněk Skuherský, Ludevít Procházka, Vojtěch a Jan Hřímalí, Josef Paleček and Viennese tenor Gustav Walter. 
 
She then studied with Josef Jiránek, Karel ze Slavkovských, Ludevít Procházka, and Jindřich Kaan. In Berlin her teacher was Karl-Heinrich Barth at the Hochschule für Musik (1882–1883). She studied composition privately with Zdeněk Fibich and Vítězslav Novák and began composing at the age of thirteen. Emingerová performed her first solo concert at age nineteen in the Konvikt concert hall.

In the 1870s Emingerová began composing dances, especially polkas, which were popular at the Prague balls. She also composed for orchestra, chamber ensembles, choir and solo voice. In 1890 she began work at the Prague Conservatory, first as a student accompanist and then after 1911 as a piano and chamber music professor.  She continued working at the Conservatory for thirty-eight years before retiring in 1928.

Writing career

Emingerová continued to perform as an accompanist and also began to perform in connection with her lectures on music, some of which were later published in book form and as articles in magazines and newspapers. She prepared and issued print collections of old Czech composers, and in the early 20th century, she began to contribute to Female World, Women's Horizon, Eve and the New Woman, promoting women composers such as Fanny Mendelssohn-Bartholdyová, Augusta Mary Anne Holmes, Cécile Chaminade, Johann Muller-Herrmanová, Lisa Maria Mayer, Ethel Mary Smyth, Mary Lola Beranová-Stark and Florentina Mall.

Emingerová also contributed articles to the music journals Dalibor, Smetana, and to Czech newspapers including the Prager Presse, National Press and National Policy. She wrote reviews of performances at the National Theatre, Opera Theatre Vinohrady, Czech Philharmonic Orchestra, Chamber Music Society and the Prague Conservatory.  She also wrote a number of essays on the music education of children.

Emingerová's papers are held in the library and archives of the Prague Conservatory, the Museum of National Literature, the National Museum and the Czech Museum of Music.

Works

Piano Works (2 hand): 
Inventions
Concert Etude
Reminders (1872)
Neighborhood
Mignonette-Polka (1875)
Ni-Polka (1877–1878)
Sychrovská Galop (1879)
Tarantella, Op. 4 (approx. 1882)
Polka melancholic
Valse mignonne
  
Tracks Piano (4 Hand): 
Festive March (1899)
Lullaby
 
Works for Violin and Piano: 
Polonaise
Sonata (1881)
 
Songs for voice and piano: 
An Dich (lyrics Maria Janitschek)
Weiss das sie ja schon lange
Frühlingslied (1880)
Star of Hope (1880)
Gute Nacht (1889)
It seemed to me that you 'died (1890)
Two songs for high voice
Old-songs (1930)
Two songs for high voice with piano accompaniment
Believe me, the bloom on the wings of a butterfly
How Gem (1883)
Just watch
Werners Jung Lied
People were talking
Liebeszauber
The thickness of the eye (1880)
Prayer (1880)
In heaven and on earth
Piper (1896)
Pilgrim
Kovařovic Andula (1896)
You as a dreamy sky
Evening Song
Princess Dandelion (1901)
 
Songs for two voices with piano:
Three Czech Folksongs (1880)
I would like
Duets for Female Voices
Star and hope (lyrics by Elizabeth Krásnohorská)
  
Women's Choirs: 
Four songs for women's voices (1900)
Duets for Female Voices
Svatvečer
 
Men's Choirs: 
Torches here!
Spouses
Funny Chorus for four male voices (1901)
 
Mixed Choirs: 
O salutaris Away (1901)
 
Orchestral Songs:
Reminders (polka, 1872)
Rusalka (polka, 1873)
Sparks (gallop)
Off (gallop, 1874)
Zefyri (gallop, 1875)
Mignonette (Polka, 1875)
Josephine (gallop, 1878)
Sychrovská (gallop, 1879)
Slavic bouquet (Quadrille, 1879)
Forest Legend (Quadrille, 1880)
Waltz (1882)
Memories of the castle Eisenberg (Quadrille, 1882)
Tarantella (1882)

References

1856 births
1934 deaths
19th-century classical composers
20th-century classical composers
Academic staff of the Prague Conservatory
Czech music educators
Czech Romantic composers
Women classical composers
Women music educators
20th-century women composers
19th-century women composers